Secret Code LB 17 (German: Geheimzeichen LB 17) is a 1938 German thriller film directed by Victor Tourjansky and starring Willy Birgel, Hilde Weissner and Bernhard Minetti. It was made at the Babelsberg Studios outside Berlin.
The film's sets were designed by the art directors Karl Böhm and Erich Czerwonski.

Synopsis
The authorities attempt to track down a terrorist group who have assassinated the Minister of War. They soon begin to suspect they have a traitor in their own ranks.

Cast

References

Bibliography 
 Noack, Frank. Veit Harlan: The Life and Work of a Nazi Filmmaker. University Press of Kentucky, 2016.

External links 
 

1938 films
1930s spy thriller films
German spy thriller films
Films of Nazi Germany
1930s German-language films
Films directed by Victor Tourjansky
Terra Film films
Films set in Europe
German black-and-white films
Films shot at Babelsberg Studios
1930s German films